The Afghanistan women's national football team (Dari: تیم ملی فوتبال زنان افغانستان) is the women's national team of Afghanistan until the fall of Kabul in 2021. They played under the authority the Afghanistan Football Federation (AFF).

History

Early History

The team was formed in 2007 by the Afghanistan National Olympic Committee with players taken from selected school girls in Kabul. That year, the team played for the first time against the International Security Assistance Force (ISAF) women's side, with Afghanistan winning 5–0. In 2008, the team traveled to Pakistan to participate in the second national tournament of Pakistan. There they won their group stage and semi-final games but lost to Baluchistan in the final.

In an attempt to improve the quality of women's football, the team was sent to Germany in 2008 to hold a preparation camp. Later in the year, the Afghan team traveled to Jordan to participate in the Islamic Countries Women's Football Tournament. The results this time were less favourable as they faced established and more experienced teams for the first time. Afghanistan lost all of its games by at least 17 goals. 

In February 2009, the team went to Jordan again, but this time for a training camp. The Netherlands' Women's Football Federation has shown interest in helping the team and has invited them for a training camp in Netherlands.  In October 2010 the team played a friendly match against ISAF on the NATO ground in Kabul. The Afghans won 1–0.

In May 2010, Danish sports brand Hummel International sponsored male, female and youth teams of Afghanistan, and in December the team played its first official international game, against Nepal during the South Asian Football Federation Women's Championships in Cox's Bazar, Bangladesh. On 16 February 2012 they completed a 2–0 win against Qatar, their first official international victory. On 10 June 2014 Afghanistan Football Federation moved from South Asian Football Federation to Central Asian Football Association.

SAFF Championship

2010 Championship
The 2010 SAFF Women's Championship in Bangladesh marked the first appearance of Afghanistan in a major  international tournament. In it, they played their first official game, against Nepal, where they were defeated by an overwhelming 13–0 scoreline. They then faced their neighboring rivals, Pakistan, and lost by the score of 3–0. In their last game, they faced Maldives in a match which ended with the equal score of 2–2. Afghanistan was subsequently eliminated from the tournament with only one point.

2012 Championship
The 2012 SAFF Women's Championship in Sri Lanka was the second time that Afghanistan disputed an international tournament. They faced Maldives in their first game and drew 1–1. Diba Naweed scored the team's only goal in that match. The following game with Pakistan marked Afghanistan's second win, outscoring their opponents with an abundant 4–0 goal difference. Hailai Arghandiwal and Marjan Haydaree scored one goal each, while Shabnam Rohin scored two goals in the match. The last group phase game was against Nepal, and ended in a heavy defeat of 7–1. The only goal was scored by Marjan Haydaree. Afghanistan advanced to the Semi-Finals after placing second in the group. The Semi-Final match was with India, and ended with a crushing 11–0 defeat. Thus, Afghanistan finished the tournament as one of the Semi-Final losers.

2014 Championship
The 2014 SAFF Women's Championship in Pakistan was the third time that Afghanistan disputed an international tournament. Their first game ended with a 6–1 defeat against Bangladesh. The goal was scored by Marjan Haydaree. They lost the second match 1–0 against Maldives. Their third and last encounter ended in a crushing 12–0 defeat against India. Afghanistan were eliminated from the tournament with 0 points. This marked Afghanistan's least successful participation in the SAFF Women's Championship.

2016 efforts
2016 marked a big year for the Afghanistan Women's National Team as they received support from the Afghanistan Football Federation and hired a new coaching staff consisting of head coach Kelly Lindsey, assistant coach Haley Carter, and program director Khalida Popal. The team also hired fitness coach John De Witt, PhD and team physio Joelle Muro, DPT.

Along with these hires, the team prepared for the 2016 SAFF Women's Championship held in India.

The team also had a partnership with Diehard Scarves who produced official Afghanistan Women's National Team Supporter Scarves. A portion of the proceeds from these sales went to the team in their fundraising efforts in preparation for the 2016 SAFF Women's Championship.  During the tournament the team lost to India (27 December 2016, lost 5–1, goal scorer was Farkhunda Muhtaj in the 88th minute) and Bangladesh (29 December, lost 6–0).

The team won Tournament AFSO 2016.

2018 CAFA Women's Championship and abuse allegations
The first CAFA tournament for the women's team resulted in four matches with defeats. They earned their biggest defeat, 20–0 to Uzbekistan, who won the first tournament of the women's championship in Central Asia.

In November 2018, male staff of the Afghanistan Football Federation were accused of sexual and physical abuse of Afghanistan women's players. The allegations included the federation's president, Keramuudin Karim.

2021 exodus

Withdrawal from international competitions
In August 2021, following the takeover of the country by the Taliban, former team captain Khalida Popal who was based in Denmark, urged players to delete their social media accounts,  erase public identities and burn their kits for safety's sake as they are again under Taliban rule. On 25 August, the Australian government announced they had evacuated 75 Afghan women athletes including football players. FIFPro and Popal worked with authorities in six countries, including Australia, the US, and the UK, to get athletes and their families airlifted out of Afghanistan. FIFPro general secretary Jonas Baer-Hoffmann described the evacuations as "an incredibly complex process".

The national team also withdrew from the 2022 AFC Women's Asian Cup qualifiers.

Regroup as football club

The Afghanistan women's national team were able to regroup in Australia in early 2022. They secured a partnership with A-League club Melbourne Victory, thus enabling the team to continue operating and to train at the Darebin International Sports Centre.

As of December 2022, it is unclear if, or when, FIFA would allow the team to play official international matches again.

In March 2022, the national team was admitted into Football Victoria's state league: they were placed in State League 4 West, the seventh tier of Australian women's football and sixth in the Victorian structure. In May 2022, the team's development side which were relocated to the UK following the fall of Kabul played a friendly against non-FIFA team Surrey in Dorking.

Afghanistan was included in the draw in January 2023 for the 2024 AFC Women's Olympic Qualifying Tournament. The country subsequently withdrew after the draw.

Team image

Kits and crest
In 2011 the Afghanistan Football Federation had signed a 4-year contract with Hummel, to provide both the Men's and the Women's National Team for all of the sportswear from 2011 till 2015. On 6 March 2015, the Afghan Football Federation signed a new 4-year contract with hummel till 2019.

In 2016, Hummel designed a ground-breaking uniform for the Afghanistan Women's National Team which included an integrated hijab. This provides more flexibility with movements that the players can use while wearing their uniforms.

Kit suppliers

Home stadium
The major football matches in Afghanistan are held at the Afghan Football Federation Stadium (popularly known as the Ghazi Stadium) in  Kabul. It was built during the reign of King Amanullah Khan in 1923. The stadium has a capacity of around 25,000 people.

Results and fixtures

The following is a list of match results in the last 12 months, as well as any future matches that have been scheduled.

Legend

2023

Coaching staff

Current coaching staff

Manager history

, after the match against .

Head-to-head record

, after the match against .

Competitive record

FIFA Women's World Cup

*Draws include knockout matches decided on penalty kicks.

AFC Women's Asian Cup

*Draws include knockout matches decided on penalty kicks.

CAFA Women's Championship

SAFF Women's Championship (2010–2016)

*Draws include knockout matches decided on penalty kicks.

See also

 Sport in Afghanistan
 Football in Afghanistan
 Women's football in Afghanistan
 Afghanistan men's national football team

References

External links
 اردوی تیم ملی فوتبال زنان افغانستان در آلمان
 Afghanistan women's football team picture

 
Nat
Asian women's national association football teams
Former national association football teams in Asia